Dubai Cares is a UAE-based global philanthropic organization that advocates for children's rights. It was founded on September 19, 2007 by Mohammed bin Rashid Al Maktoum, Vice President and Prime Minister of the UAE and Ruler of Dubai.

The organization has worked in the following countries: Afghanistan, Angola, Antigua and Barbuda, Bangladesh, Bosnia & Herzegovina, Cambodia, Chad, Comoros Islands, Colombia, Djibouti, Ecuador, Egypt, Ethiopia, Gambia, Ghana, Guatemala, Haiti, Honduras, India, Indonesia, Iraq, Ivory Coast, Jordan, Kenya, Kiribati, Laos, Lebanon, Lesotho, Liberia, Madagascar, Malawi, Mali, Mauritania, Mexico, Mozambique, Nepal, Nicaragua, Niger, Pakistan, Palestine, Paraguay,  Peru, Philippines, Rwanda, Senegal, Sierra Leone, South Africa, South Sudan, Sri Lanka, St. Vincent & Grenadines, Sudan, Tajikistan, Tanzania, Togo, Uganda, Vanuatu, Vietnam, Yemen, Zambia and Zimbabwe.

References

External links
 Dubai Cares official English website

International educational charities
Charities based in the United Arab Emirates
Educational organisations based in the United Arab Emirates
2007 establishments in the United Arab Emirates